Mubarak Ahmad Gul (born 1951), also known as Mubarak Gul, is an Indian politician and a former member of Jammu and Kashmir Legislative Assembly from Eidgah constituency. Affiliated with Jammu & Kashmir National Conference, he also served speaker of the Jammu and Kashmir legislative assembly in 2013 to 2015 and advisor to the then chief minister Omar Abdullah.

Biography 
Gul was born in 1951. He started his political career as a councillor in 1976 and was also the president of Rural Development Society, Jammu and Kashmir Youth Federation, in addition to serving as the president of youth wing of National Conference. After electing to the assembly in 1983, the party declined to give him mandate, but was later selected to the upper house by the NC party, the ruling party of that time.

He was first elected to the Jammu and Kashmir assembly in 1983, and then in 1996, 2002, and 2008. He contested his last election in 2014 assembly polls and won from Eidgah constituency.

On 28 February 2013, Gul replaced Akbar Lone as the Speaker of the Jammu and Kashmir Legislative Assembly, as Lone was taken into the Cabinet by CM Omar Abdullah.

References

Further reading 
 
 

Living people
1951 births
Speakers of the Jammu and Kashmir Legislative Assembly
Jammu and Kashmir MLAs 2014–2018
Jammu and Kashmir MLAs 2008–2014
Jammu and Kashmir MLAs 2002–2008
Jammu and Kashmir MLAs 1996–2002
Jammu and Kashmir MLAs 1983–1986
University of Kashmir alumni
Place of birth missing (living people)